The Juye Incident refers to the killing of two German Catholic missionaries, Richard Henle and Franz Xaver Nies, of the Society of the Divine Word, in Juye County Shandong Province, China in the night of 1–2 November 1897 (All Saints' Day to All Souls' Day). A third missionary, Georg Maria Stenz, survived the attack unharmed.

The mission compound where the incident took place was located in Zhang Jia Village (spelled "Tshantyachuang" in writings by Georg M. Stenz), about 10 km northeast of the town of Juye and about 25 km northwest of the city of Jining. Georg M. Stenz was the priest stationed in Zhang Jia Village and the other two missionaries, Henle and Nies, had come to visit him. Stenz describes the events of the incident as follows: Before they went to bed shortly before midnight, the missionaries had practiced the Requiem Mass (Miseremini mei) for the following All Souls' Day. Stenz had given his room to his guests for the night and had moved into a vacant porter's room himself. Believing the area to be quiet, the missionaries did not take any precautions and Stenz left the door to his room unlocked. A band of twenty to thirty armed men broke into the mission compound shortly after the missionaries had gone to bed. They broke the door to the room where Henle and Nies were staying and killed the two missionaries. Both victims were found to have suffered numerous wounds from stabbing and both were dead shortly before midnight. The attackers searched for Stenz, but could not find him. They retreated when the local Chinese Christians arrived at the scene to help. It is not certain who committed the killings, but it is most commonly assumed that the attack was launched by members of the Big Swords Society. Stenz blamed the attack on the warden of a neighboring village (Cao Jia Zhuang, spelled "Tsaotyachuang" by Stenz and located about 10 km to the south of Zhang Jia Village) and believed that the attack was rooted in a dispute between the warden and comparatively wealthy relatives who had converted to Christianity and had therefore refused to pay for local temple feasts.

Less than two weeks after the Juye Incident, the German Empire used the murders of the missionaries as a pretext to seize Jiaozhou Bay on Shandong's southern coast. Under German threats, the Qing government was also forced to remove many Shandong officials (including governor Li Bingheng) from their posts and to build three Catholic churches in the area (in Jining, Caozhou, and Juye) at its own expense. The mission that had been attacked also received 3,000 taels of silver in compensation for stolen or damaged property, and received the right to construct seven fortified residences in the area, also at government expense. This settlement strengthened missionary work in southern Shandong province and was part of the events that led to the Boxer Uprising (1899–1900), a movement directed against the Christian and foreign presence in northern China. Imitating Germany, other powers (Russia, Britain, France, and Japan) began "a scramble for concessions" to secure their own spheres of influence in China.

Historian Paul Cohen has called the Juye incident "the opening wedge in a process of greatly intensified imperialist activity in China" and Joseph W. Esherick comments that the Juye killings "set off a chain of events which radically altered the course of Chinese history."

Notes

Bibliography

 .
 .
 .
 
 .

Further reading

Catholic Cyclopaedia: Chinese Martyrs
 Tiedemann, R. G. (2007b). "Not Every Martyr is a Saint! The Juye Missionary Case of 1897 Reconsidered." In Noel Golvers and Sara Lievens (eds.), A lifelong dedication to the China mission: essays presented in honor of Father Jeroom Heyndrickx, CICM, on the occasion of his 75th birthday and the 25th anniversary of the F. Verbiest Institute, K.U. Leuven. Leuven Chinese studies, 17. Leuven, Belgium: Ferdinand Verbiest Institute, K.U. Leuven. , .

Christian missions in China
1897 in China
Diplomatic incidents
Foreign relations of the Qing dynasty
History of Shandong
November 1897 events
Violence against Christians
Anti-Christian sentiment in Asia
History of Christianity in China
1897 murders in China